Lasiurus atratus, the greater red bat, is a species of vesper bat. It is found in Guyana, Venezuela, French Guiana and Suriname.

References

atratus
Bats of South America
Mammals of Suriname
Mammals of Guyana
Mammals described in 1996
Taxonomy articles created by Polbot